Chamby railway station is a railway station in the municipality of Montreux, in the Swiss canton of Vaud. It is located at the junction of the  Montreux–Lenk im Simmental railway line of the Montreux Oberland Bernois Railway the and Blonay–Chamby railway line of Transports Montreux–Vevey–Riviera. The latter is operated as a heritage railway by the Blonay–Chamby Museum Railway.

Services 
 the following services stop at Chamby:

References

External links 
 
 

Railway stations in the canton of Vaud
Montreux Oberland Bernois Railway stations